Tatsinsky District is an administrative and municipal district (raion), one of the forty-three in Rostov Oblast, Russia. It is located in the center of the oblast. Its administrative center is the rural locality (a stanitsa) of Tatsinskaya. Population: 38,464 (2010 Census);  The population of Tatsinskaya accounts for 26.0% of the district's total population.

References

Notes

Sources

Districts of Rostov Oblast